Haigiopagurus diegensis is a species of crustacean in the genus Haigiopagurus of the family Paguridae.

References

Hermit crabs